The Temnocyoninae are an extinct subfamily of medium-sized bear dogs endemic to North America that lived during the Early Oligocene to Early Miocene about 30.8-20.43 million years ago (Mya) existing for around 10 million years.

References

Bear dogs
Oligocene caniforms
Miocene carnivorans
Aquitanian extinctions
Prehistoric mammals of North America
White River Fauna
Oligocene first appearances